The Fifth Season may refer to:

 The Fifth Season (Quidam album), a 2009 live album by Quidam
 The Fifth Season (film), a 2012 Belgian film
 The Fifth Season (novel), a 2015 novel by N. K. Jemisin
 The Fifth Season (Oh My Girl album), a 2019 album by Oh My Girl
 The Fifth Season (Lafawndah album), a 2020 album by Lafawndah
 Fifth Season, a production company majority-owned by CJ ENM

Fifth season may also mean the period of spring floods in the Soomaa National Park in Estonia.